Lucio Godina (March 8, 1908 – November 24, 1936) and Simplicio Godina (March 8, 1908 – December 8, 1936) were pygopagus conjoined twins from the island of Samar in the Philippines.

At the age of 21 they married Natividad and Victorina Matos, who were identical twins. They performed in various sideshow acts, including in an orchestra on Coney Island and in dance with their wives.

After Lucio died of rheumatic fever in New York City, doctors operated to separate him from Simplicio. Simplicio survived the operation, but died shortly thereafter due to spinal meningitis.

References 

1908 births
1936 deaths
Conjoined twins
Filipino twins